Gao Shi (ca. 704–765) was a poet of the Tang Dynasty, two of whose poems were collected in the popular anthology Three Hundred Tang Poems. His courtesy name was Dàfú.

Born into an impoverished family, Gao eventually became a secretary in the military, enjoying a successful career. His hometown was either in modern Hunan Province or Shandong Province.

Gao Shi was one of the competitors in the famous wine shop competition along with Wang Zhihuan and Wang Changling.

Life

Early years
Gao Shi is generally considered to have been born in 704, in Cangzhou(沧州). He spent his childhood in Guangzhou where his father worked as an officer in Shaozhou(广东韶关). 
Afterward, Gao Shi traveled around middle and southern China for more than 10 years and moved to Songzhou(宋州). During this time, he failed to find a way to become an official.In 731, Gao Shi moved to Shuofang(朔方) and joined the army. He witnessed the fight with the Khitan people and created many of his masterpieces like "A Song of the Yan Country".

Become an official
After the war, Gao Shi moved back to Songzhou and started another round of traveling. In the next 10 years, Gao Shi met Li Bai, Du Fu, and many other famous poets.
In 749, Gao Shi was recommended by Zhang Jiugao(张九皋). He became a county lieutenant in that autumn and visit the frontier as an official for the next 2 years.
In the next several years, Gao Shi traveled around the frontier with the army. As the war is going well, Gao Shi keeps getting promoted.

success in old age
In 755, The An Lushan Rebellion took place, as a secretary in the military, Gao Shi had more chances to meet the emperor and show his talent.
After a chain of promotion, Gao Shi finally became the jiedushi of Chengdu.

Poems
One of Gao Shi's poems (as translated by Witter Bynner), appearing in the Tang 300 was "A Song of the Yan Country", referring to the Yan territory of the An and Shi "Yan dynasty": the other being "To Vice-prefects Li and Wang degraded and transferred to Xiazhong and Changsha". he moved back to the capital in 764 and in his last days, he became the deputy minister of the ministry of punishment. In February 17th, 765, Gao Shi dead in his home in Changan.

Notes

References
Wu, John C. H. (1972). The Four Seasons of Tang Poetry. Rutland, Vermont: Charles E.Tuttle. 

Three Hundred Tang Poems poets
765 deaths
706 births
Tang dynasty politicians
Politicians from Hengshui
Poets from Hebei
8th-century Chinese poets